The Centro de Eventos Valle del Pacifico (Pacific Valley Events Center) is a convention center located in the city of Cali, Colombia on the highway between Yumbo and Cali.

History 
The Centro de Eventos Valle del Pacifico - CEVP, was founded on November 6 of 2007. Its construction was due to the efforts of the public, private and independent entrepreneurs of Valle del Cauca guided by the Chamber of Commerce of Cali. The financial resources for its construction were gathered by 58 regional and national companies who contributed by buying shares, donating and acquiring advertising spaces.
openms

From 2008, it is member of the International Congress and Convention Association - ICCA, a global community for the meetings industry, enabling its members to generate and maintain significant competitive advantage. 
This same year The Centro de Eventos Valle del Pacifico receives the "Rosa de los Vientos" award, as the best Convention Centre, this award is given by the Colombian Tourism Press and Writers Association, (ACOPE, in Spanish).

Structure 
The architectural complex of the Centro de Eventos Valle del Pacifico comprises 2 main buildings, 1 registration building, 2 pavilions, a central plaza, 4 committee rooms, 4 additional meeting rooms, a media room, 1 tourist information point (TIP), 16 simultaneous translation rooms, exhibition space for placing 500 stands, a food court and a great water fountain that represents the Pacific region.

Additionally, it counts with up dated technology, overall security, parking lot for 1.200 vehicles, luggage room, nursing, ATM, gift shop, travel agency, logistics platform for exhibitors to load and unload, dressing rooms, props and museum round. It is also a Transitional Zone for handling goods with special customs regime.

Events 
The Centro de Eventos Valle del Pacifico has served as host of many important events since its foundation date:
 First City Marketing World Congress 
 Latinamerican Conference on Water and Sanitation – Latinosan 
 Junior Weightlifting Worldcup
 Fencing Worldcup
 International Symposium on Microfinance
 International Conference on Safe Communities 
 Congress on Small and Medium Companies of the Americas
 World Summit on the UN Biodiversity 
 International Agroindustry Macro Forum
 Women Entrepreneurship Summit
 OEA (American States Organisation) Ministers and High Authorities Meeting
 Cali Exposhow - International Fashion Show 
 Iberoamerican Chambers of Commerce Assembly, AICO 
 4th Free Trade Negotiation Round between Colombia and South Korea  
 Pacific Motor Show
 16th International Plastic Surgery Course 
 16th International Logistics Managers Encounter 
 5th International Social Responsibility Encounter 
 International Congress on Agriculture, Sustainability and New Business 
 Tourism Competes 2010

See also 
List of convention centers
Corferias
Valle del Cauca
Yumbo

References 

Buildings and structures in Cali
Convention centers in Colombia
Indoor arenas in Colombia